Ria Hebden  ( Cunningham; born 2 January 1983) is an English journalist and television presenter. She has been reporting on This Morning's Sofa Tour since 2018 and has been the entertainment editor on Lorraine since January 2020. Since 2020, she has co-presented All Around Britain with Alex Beresford.

Early life 
Hebden was born on 2 January 1983. She went to Brunel University London between 2001 and 2004, graduating with a 2:1 BA Hons.

Career 
After graduating university, Hebden worked as a publicist for companies such as Channel 4 and Twentieth Century Fox.

Hebden founded Wonder Women TV in 2016, an organisation devoted to recruiting and empowering women in television. She also presents a podcast The Wonder Women TV Podcast. Hebden also hosts a show on BBC Radio London. Hebden is also a patron for the MAMA Youth Project.

Hebden started reporting for Sunday Morning Live in 2018 and in 2019, became a co-presenter alongside Sean Fletcher, as part of a diversity shake-up. However, as of 2021 Hebden has returning to reporting for the show. In January 2020, Hebden became the entertainment editor on Lorraine. In 2020, Hebden stepped in for Ranvir Singh on All Around Britain, co-presenting with Alex Beresford, whilst she competed in Strictly Come Dancing. In 2021, ITV commissioned another series of the show, with Hebden returning alongside Beresford as presenter.

In 2021, Hebden appeared in a video aired on television and radio discussing and shutting down conspiracy theories about the COVID-19 vaccine. In January 2022, Hebden participated in the fourteenth series of Dancing on Ice and was eliminated second.

Personal life 
Hebden married her husband Mark in 2012 and together they have two children.

Awards and nominations 
 Nominated in the 2018 Diversity in Media Awards - Presenter of the Year

References

External links

1983 births
Living people
English journalists
English television presenters
Alumni of Brunel University London